Annette Dobmeier (born 10 February 1968) is a German former fencer. She won a silver medal in the women's team foil event at the 1992 Summer Olympics.

References

External links
 

1968 births
Living people
German female fencers
German foil fencers
Olympic fencers of Germany
Fencers at the 1992 Summer Olympics
Olympic silver medalists for Germany
Olympic medalists in fencing
People from Tauberbischofsheim
Sportspeople from Stuttgart (region)
Medalists at the 1992 Summer Olympics
20th-century German women